Rubén Santos (born 25 September 1976) is a Spanish diver. He competed in the men's 10 metre platform event at the 2000 Summer Olympics.

References

1976 births
Living people
Spanish male divers
Olympic divers of Spain
Divers at the 2000 Summer Olympics
Place of birth missing (living people)